Church of St. Basil of Ostrog may refer to:

Church of St. Basil of Ostrog, Belgrade, in Bežanijska Kosa neighbourhood of New Belgrade, Serbia
Church of St. Basil of Ostrog, Leposavić, Mitrovica District in Kosovo
Ostrog monastery, a Serbian Orthodox Church monastery in Ostroška Greda, Montenegro
St. Basil of Ostrog Monastery, a monastery of the Serbian Orthodox Churchin Crnogorci near the town of Imotski in Dalmatia, Croatia